Book Lovers Day is celebrated on August 9 every year. This is an unofficial holiday observed to encourage bibliophiles to celebrate reading and literature. People are advised to put away their smartphones and every possible technological distraction and pick up a book to read. Book Lovers Day is widely recognized on global scale yet its origin and creator remain unknown to date.

References

August observances
Book promotion
Reading (process)
Unofficial observances